The Rain God is a novel by Arturo Islas. The story deals with a Mexican family living in a town on the U.S.-Mexican border, illustrating its members’ struggle to cope with physical handicaps, sexuality, racial and ethnic identification in their new surroundings. The Rain God was awarded the best fiction prize from the Border Regional Library Conference in 1985 and was selected by the Bay Area Reviewers Association as one of the three best novels of 1984.

Plot overview 

In the first chapter, Miguel Chico, son to Miguel Grande and Juanita is introduced.  He is the only member of the Angel family to achieve a college education so far, and he lives away from the rest of the family in San Francisco.  Because he has chosen to live so far away, he is viewed with suspicion  by some members of the family.

Nina, Juanita’s sister, is presented in the following chapter.  Her sexual and rebellious nature, which caused many fights and arguments with her father, has been passed on to her son Antony.  Nina, not having learned from the mistakes she used to criticize her father of, does not peacefully settle the differences between herself and her son.  After one of their fights, Antony dies, and it's unclear if the death was a suicide.

Another “sinner” is profiled in chapter three: Miguel Chico’s father; Miguel Grande, who is having an affair with Lola, who is his wife Juanita's best friend. He is torn between them and unable to choose.

Chapter four tells the story of Miguel Grande’s brother Felix, who is killed by a soldier toward whom he made sexual advances.  In chapter five, Felix’s son,  Joel, has night terrors as a child; the chapter deals with his feelings about his father's death.

In the last chapter, the family matriarch, Mama Chona, Miguel Grande’s mother is portrayed as a beast-like figure. Having fled from the 1911 Mexican Revolution, Mama Chona tried to hold the Angel family together and keep its dignity all her life, but fails miserably.

Main characters 

 Miguel Chico is the son of the Miguel Grande and Juanita. He attends a prestigious private school, one of the first people of Mexican origin to do so, and eventually becomes a university professor living in San Francisco. He suffers from chronic ill health. Because Miguel Chico is not married and only visits his family rarely, he is suspected of being a homosexual. He has a reasonably good relationship with his mother but is mostly estranged from his father, Miguel Grande. Miguel Chico can also be seen as the narrator of the book. There are many analogies between Islas and the character of Miguel Chico. Like Chico, Islas suffered from polio when he was eight and had to undergo long sessions of physical therapy. The illness left him with a permanent limp. In 1969, he underwent a major surgery and got a colostomy. Also like Chico, Islas lived in San Francisco; he also used his hometown as the template for the town where the Angel family lives in his book. And Islas and his cousins were taught reading by his grandmother, like Mama Chona teaches her grandchildren in the novel.
 Miguel Grande is Juanita's husband and Mama Chona's youngest child. He was named after his deceased brother. He is described as a big, dominant, hard-working policeman and family patriarch. Miguel Grande is very selfish and inconsiderate, and does not care about the feelings of others. He avoids his relatives as much as possible, except his mother, whom he visits nearly every day. Miguel Grande takes advantage of his wife's naivete by having several affairs, including with Lola, her best friend. Miguel Grande and his son Miguel Chico have no close relationship.
 Felix is the oldest surviving son of Mama Chona and married to Angie, with whom he has four children: Yerma, Magdalena, Roberto and JoEl. He married Angie without the blessing of Mama Chona, who considers her a low-class Mexican. He is also homosexual, and therefore a "sexual sinner" in the eyes of his family. He is close to his aunt, Tia Cuca, also seen as a sexual sinner.
 Nina is the sister of Juanita. She works as an accountant for various business firms, and is also interested in the supernatural. She has a fractious relationship with her conservative and violent father.

Critical studies 
(as of March 2008)
 Marta E. Sánchez, "Arturo Islas' The Rain God: An Alternative Tradition," American Literature 62.2 (Jun. 1990), pp. 284–304. Stable URL.
 Rosaura Sáanchez, "Ideological Discourses in Arturo Islas' The Rain God," Criticism in the Borderlands: Studies in Chicano Literature, Culture, and Ideology, Ed. Hectór Calderón and José David Saldívar, Duke UP, pp. 114–126  (accessed via Google Scholar, 6 March 2008).
 Antonio C. Márquez, "The Historical Imagination in Arturo Islas's The Rain God and Migrant Souls," MELUS 19.2, (Summer 1994), pp. 3–16. Stable URL.
 Emily Caroline Perkins, "Recovery and Loss: Politics of the Disabled Male Chicano." Disability Studies Quarterly, 2006 Winter; 26 (1): [no pagination].
 Yolanda Padilla, Indian Mexico: The Changing Face of Indigeneity in Mexican American Literature, 1910–1984 (dissertation)
 David Rice, "Sinners among Angels, or Family History and the Ethnic Narrator in Arturo Islas's The Rain God and Migrant Souls." Lit: Literature Interpretation Theory, 2000 Aug; 11 (2): 169-97.
 Wilson Neate, "Repression and the Abject Body: Writing the Family History in Arturo Islas's The Rain God." Revista Canaria de Estudios Ingleses, 1997 Nov; 35: 211-32.
 Manuel de Jesús Vega, "Chicano, Gay, and Doomed: AIDS in Arturo Islas' The Rain God." Confluencia: Revista Hispanica de Cultura y Literatura, 1996 Spring; 11 (2): 112-18.
 Paul Skenazy, "Borders and Bridges, Doors and Drugstores: Toward a Geography of Time." IN: Fine and Skenazy, San Francisco in Fiction: Essays in a Regional Literature. Albuquerque: U of New Mexico P; 1995. pp. 198–216
 José David Saldívar, "The Hybridity of Culture in Arturo Islas's The Rain God." IN: Colatrella and Alkana, Cohension and Dissent in America. Albany: State U of New York P; 1994. pp. 159–73; also in Dispositio: Revista Americana de Estudios Comparados y Culturales/American Journal of Comparative and Cultural S, 1991; 16 (41): 109-19.
 Lupe Cárdenas, "Growing Up Chicano-Crisis Time in Three Contemporary Chicano Novels (Pocho, Y no se lo tragó la tierra, and The Rain God)." Confluencia: Revista Hispanica de Cultura y Literatura, 1987 Fall; 3 (1): 129-136.
 Erlinda Gonzales-Berry, "Sensuality, Repression, and Death in Arturo Islas's The Rain God." The Bilingual Review/La Revista Bilingue, 1985 Sept.-Dec.; 12 (3): 258-261.
 Adrian Xavier Juarez, "Middle Class Worries In Arturo Islas' The Rain God." (dissertation), California State University, Northridge

See also 

 Mexican Americans
 Chicano literature
 List of Mexican American writers

References

Hispanic and Latino American novels
1984 American novels
Novels set in San Francisco
Novels set in Texas
Novels set in Mexico
Novels with gay themes